The Pacific War (1941–1945), also known as the Pacific Theaters of World War II, was a conflict that pitted Axis forces, primarily the Empire of Japan, against the Allies.

"Pacific War" may also refer to:
 Wars
 War of the Pacific: An 1879–1884 war between Chile and an alliance of Peru and Bolivia
 Novels
 The Great Pacific War, a 1925 novel about a fictitious war
 Pacific War series (2007–2008), alternate history novels by Newt Gingrich & William R. Forstchen, with Albert S. Hanser
 Games
 War in the Pacific (video game)
 Gary Grigsby's Pacific War, by Strategic Simulations (1992)
 Great Pacific War, part of the Third Reich/Great Pacific War series (2003)

See also
 Pacific Theatre (disambiguation)